Family Game is a Canadian crime drama film, directed by Rafaël Ouellet and released in 2022.

Set in the Bas-Saint-Laurent region of Quebec, the film centres on the Arsenaults, a family who have been involved in illegal poaching and reselling of wild meat out of the back of the family-owned garage. Older son Adam (Guillaume Cyr) wants to get out of the criminal enterprise and run the business honestly, but finds his plans complicated by the return of his more criminally inclined younger brother Anthony (Pierre-Paul Alain) and the arrival in town of Émilie (Karine Vanasse), a radio host.

The film's cast also includes Luc Picard as Adam and Anthony's father André, Julien Poulin as their grandfather Armand, and Micheline Lanctôt as Irène.

Ouellet has described the film as an attempt to incorporate influences from The Godfather, GoodFellas and the films of James Gray into his own filmmaking style, which has traditionally been character drama driven by dialogue rather than plot. The film was shot in and around Ouellet's own hometown of Dégelis in 2021, and had its commercial theatrical premiere in June 2022.

The film was shortlisted for the Prix collégial du cinéma québécois in 2023.

References

External links
 
 Arsenault & Sons (version in French with English subtitles) at Library and Archives Canada

2022 films
2022 crime drama films
Canadian crime drama films
Films directed by Rafaël Ouellet
French-language Canadian films
2020s Canadian films